Sandra Helen Edge  (born 26 August 1962 in Te Puia Springs) is a New Zealand netball coach and former international netball player.

She captained the New Zealand under 21 team in 1982, aged 17. She debuted in the Silver Ferns in Melbourne in 1985, against Australia. For the next ten years she played in a record 94 internationals and three world championships; the team won the world title in 1987. She became New Zealand team captain in 1994, and retired in 1995. The team defeated England and South Africa, and came third in the 1995 world championship. As a player she was noted as the best centre in the world.

In 1990, Edge was awarded the New Zealand 1990 Commemoration Medal. In the 1995 Queen's Birthday Honours, she was appointed a Member of the Order of the British Empire, for services to netball. She was inducted into the New Zealand Sports Hall of Fame in 2002.

Edge later became a netball coach, and in 2016 was appointed assistant coach for the Central Pulse in the new ANZ Premiership competition.

References

Further reading 
 Profiles of Fame: The stories of New Zealand’s Greatest Sporting Achievers by Ron Palenski (2002, New Zealand Sports Hall of Fame, Dunedin) p. 15 

1962 births
Living people
New Zealand netball players
New Zealand international netball players
1987 World Netball Championships players
1991 World Netball Championships players
1995 World Netball Championships players
Netball players at the 1989 World Games
New Zealand netball coaches
ANZ Premiership coaches
New Zealand Members of the Order of the British Empire
Sportspeople from Gisborne, New Zealand
People educated at Iona College, Havelock North
People from Te Puia Springs
Central Pulse coaches